This article contains information about the literary events and publications of 1921.

Events
January 1 – The publishing firm Jonathan Cape is founded in Bloomsbury, London, by Herbert Jonathan Cape and Wren Howard.
February – Margaret Caroline Anderson and Jane Heap, publishers of The Little Review, are convicted of obscenity in a New York court for publishing the "Nausicaa" episode of James Joyce's Ulysses.
March – Jorge Luis Borges returns to his native Buenos Aires in Argentina after a period living with his family in Europe.
April 20 – The Hungarian Ferenc Molnár's play Liliom is first produced on Broadway in English.
May 9 – The première of Luigi Pirandello's Six Characters in Search of an Author (Sei personaggi in cerca d'autore) at the Teatro Valle in Rome divides the audience.
May – A production of Pericles, Prince of Tyre directed by Robert Atkins at The Old Vic, London, restores the unexpurgated text for the first time since Shakespeare's day.
June 6 – The première of Tristan Tzara's parodic The Gas Heart (Le Cœur à gaz) takes place at a Dada Salon at the Galerie Montaigne in Paris. It provokes audience derision.
June 10 – D. H. Lawrence's novel Women in Love is first published commercially by Martin Secker in London.
September 5 – The Cervantes Theatre (Buenos Aires) opens with a production of Lope de Vega's La dama boba (The Foolish Lady, 1613).
September 26 – The Maddermarket Theatre in Norwich, England, an old chapel, is turned into an English Renaissance theatre for period drama by an amateur repertory company directed by Walter Nugent Monck. It opens with As You Like It.
December 9 – John William Gott becomes the last person in England imprisoned for blasphemous libel.
December 31 – Mexican poet Manuel Maples Arce distributes the first Stridentist manifesto, Comprimido estridentista, in the broadsheet Actual No. 1 in Mexico City.

New books

Fiction
Elizabeth von Arnim - Vera
Ryūnosuke Akutagawa – "Autumn Mountain" (秋山, Akiyama)
Ruby M. Ayres 
The Second Honeymoon
The Uphill Road
E.F. Benson
Dodo Wonders
Lovers and Friends
Edgar Rice Burroughs – Tarzan the Terrible
James Branch Cabell – Figures of Earth
Hall Caine – The Master of Man
Karel Čapek – Trapné povídky (Embarrassing Stories, translated as Money and other stories)
Willa Cather – Alexander's Bridge
Arthur Chapman – Mystery Ranch
A. E. Coppard – Adam & Eve & Pinch Me: Tales
Mary Cholmondeley – The Romance of His Life
Marie Corelli – The Secret Power
Miloš Crnjanski – The Journal of Čarnojević (Дневник о Чарнојевићу, Dnevnik o Čarnojeviću)
Walter de la Mare – Memoirs of a Midget
Ethel M. Dell - The Obstacle Race
Mary Frances Dowdall – Three Loving Ladies
Edna Ferber - The Girls
Fran Saleški Finžgar – Pod svobodnim soncem (Under the free sun)
F. Scott Fitzgerald
The Beautiful and Damned (serialized in Metropolitan Magazine (New York))
Flappers and Philosophers (short stories)
Mikkjel Fønhus – Troll-Elgen
John Galsworthy – To Let (last book of The Forsyte Saga)
H. Rider Haggard – She and Allan
A. P. Herbert – The House by the River
Georgette Heyer – The Black Moth
A. S. M. Hutchinson – If Winter Comes
Aldous Huxley – Crome Yellow
Frigyes Karinthy – Capillaria
Sheila Kaye-Smith – Joanna Godden
Gaston Leroux – The Crime of Rouletabille
Marie Belloc Lowndes – What Timmy Did
Denis Mackail – Romance to the Rescue
Compton Mackenzie – Rich Relatives
René Maran – Batouala
L. M. Montgomery – Rilla of Ingleside
George Moore – Heloise and Abelard
Paul Morand – Tender Shoots (Tendres stocks, short stories)
 E. Phillips Oppenheim – Jacob's Ladder
Baroness Orczy
Castles in the Air (short stories)
The First Sir Percy
Alejandro Pérez Lugín – Currito of the Cross (Currito de la Cruz)
Gene Stratton Porter – Her Father's Daughter
Marcel Proust
The Guermantes Way (Le Côté de Guermantes II, second part of vol. 3 of In Search of Lost Time)
Sodom and Gomorrah (Sodome et Gomorrhe I, first part of vol. 4 of In Search of Lost Time)
Sukumar Ray – HaJaBaRaLa
Iñigo Ed. Regalado – May Pagsinta'y Walang Puso
Dorothy Richardson - Deadlock
Berta Ruck - Sweet Stranger
Rafael Sabatini – Scaramouche
Naoya Shiga – A Dark Night's Passing (暗夜行路, An'ya Kōro; serialized 1921–37)
May Sinclair - Mr. Waddington of Wyck
Annie M. Smithson - Carmen Cavanagh
Booth Tarkington – Alice Adams
Aleksey Nikolayevich Tolstoy – The Road to Calvary (publication begins)
Sigrid Undset – Husfrue (The Wife or The Mistress of Husaby, second part of Kristin Lavransdatter)
Edgar Wallace 
The Book of All Power
The Law of the Four Just Men
Eugene Walter – The Byzantine Riddle and other stories
 Arthur Weigall – Burning Sands
Elinor Wylie – Nets to Catch the Wind
Francis Brett Young 
The Black Diamond
The Red Knight
Yevgeny Zamyatin – We (Мы; completed)

Children and young people
Dorita Fairlie Bruce – The Senior Prefect (later entitled Dimsie Goes to School)
Eleanor Farjeon – Martin Pippin in the Apple Orchard
Charles Boardman Hawes – The Great Quest
Hendrik Willem van Loon – The Story of Mankind (non-fiction)
Else Ury – Nesthäkchen Flies From the Nest

Drama
Hjalmar Bergman – Farmor och vår Herre (Grandmother and Our Lord, translated as Thy Rod and Thy Staff)
 Dorothy Brandon – Araminta Arrives
Karel Čapek – R.U.R. (Rossum's Universal Robots) (performed)
Karel and Josef Čapek – Pictures from the Insects' Life (Ze života hmyzu, published)
Clemence Dane – A Bill of Divorcement
Brandon Fleming – The Eleventh Commandment
Gerald du Maurier – Bulldog Drummond (with H.C. McNeile)
Susan Glaspell – Inheritors (written) and The Verge (performed)
Ian Hay – A Safety Match
A. de Herz – Mărgeluș (Tiny Bead)
Avery Hopwood – The Demi-Virgin
René Morax – Le Roi David
Roland Pertwee – Out to Win
Luigi Pirandello – Six Characters in Search of an Author
Sophie Treadwell - Rights
Tristan Tzara – The Gas Heart
 Edgar Wallace – M'Lady
Raden Adipati Aria Muharam Wiranatakusumah – Lutung Kasarung
Stanisław Ignacy Witkiewicz – The Water Hen (Kurka Wodna)

Poetry

Robert Frost – Mountain Interval (second print)
Langston Hughes – "The Negro Speaks of Rivers", in The Crisis
Amy Lowell - Legends
Katherine Tynan - The Handsome Brandons
William Carlos Williams – Sour Grapes
William Butler Yeats – Michael Robartes and the Dancer

Non-fiction
Adolphe Appia – L'Œuvre d'art vivant (The Living Work of Art)
Charles Bean (ed.) – Official History of Australia in the War of 1914–1918, vol. 1
Joseph Chaikov – Skulptur (first Yiddish-language work on the subject)
Grace King– Creole Families of New Orleans
Frank H. Knight – Risk, Uncertainty, and Profit
D. H. Lawrence
Sea and Sardinia
(as Lawrence H. Davison) – Movements in European History
Edward Sapir – Language: an introduction to the study of speech
Eugen von Böhm-Bawerk – Further Essays on Capital and Interest
Ludwig Wittgenstein – Tractatus Logico-Philosophicus
Zitkala-Sa – American Indian Stories

Births
January 5 – Friedrich Dürrenmatt, Swiss writer (died 1990)
January 19 – Patricia Highsmith, American crime writer (died 1995)
February 4 – Betty Friedan, American feminist author (died 2006)
February 5 – Marion Eames, Welsh novelist writing mainly in Welsh (died 2007)
February 15 – Radha Krishna Choudhary, Indian historian and writer (died 1985)
March 1 – Richard Wilbur, American poet and translator (died 2017)
March 3 – Paul Guimard, French novelist (died 2004)
March 24 – Wilson Harris, Guyanese-born poet, novelist and essayist (died 2018)
April 21 – Angela Bianchini, Italian fiction writer and literary critic (died 2018)
May 20 – Wolfgang Borchert, German author and playwright (died 1947)
May 23
James Blish, American science fiction author (died 1975)
Ray Lawler, Australian dramatist
May 29
Mona Van Duyn, American poet (died 2004)
Henry Scholberg, American bibliographer (died 2012)
June 11 – Michael Meyer, English translator and biographer (died 2000)
June 14 – John Bradburne, English poet and missionary (killed 1979)
August 11 – Alex Haley, American writer (died 1992)
August 17 – Elinor Lyon, British children's writer (died 2008)
August 18 – Frédéric Jacques Temple, French poet and writer (died 2020)
September 12 – Stanisław Lem, Polish science fiction novelist, philosopher, satirist and physician (died 2006)
September 15 – Richard Gordon, English author (died 2017)
September 16 – Mohamed Talbi, Tunisian historian (died 2017)
September 26 – Cyprian Ekwensi, Nigerian writer (died 2007)
October 2 – Edmund Crispin (Robert Bruce Montgomery), English crime writer (died 1978)
October 9 – Tadeusz Różewicz, Polish poet, dramatist and writer (died 2014)
October 17 – George Mackay Brown, Scottish poet (died 1996) 
November 6 – James Jones, American novelist (died 1977)
November 22 – Brian Cleeve, Irish author (died 2003)
December 20 – Israil Bercovici, Romanian dramatist and historian (died 1988)

Deaths
February 6 – Abba Goold Woolson, American author and poet (born 1838)
February 17 – Rosetta Luce Gilchrist, American physician, author (born 1850)
February 24 – John Habberton, American critic (born 1842)
March 22 – E. W. Hornung, English author (born 1866)
April 6 – Maximilian Berlitz, German-born American textbook writer and language school proprietor (born 1852)
May 5 – Alfred Hermann Fried, Austrian publicist (born 1864)
May 12 – Emilia Pardo Bazán, Spanish novelist (born 1851)
May 13 – Jean Aicard, French writer (born 1848)
June 5 – Georges Feydeau, French playwright (born 1862)
June 18 – Eduardo Acevedo Díaz, Uruguayan writer (born 1851)
June 20 – Mary Lynde Craig, American writer, teacher, attorney, activist (born 1834)
June 26 – Alfred Percy Sinnett, English Theosophist author (born 1840)
July 4 – Antoni Grabowski, Polish Esperantist (born 1857)
July 7 – Luca Caragiale, Romanian poet, novelist and translator (pneumonia, born 1893)
August 1 – Helen Vickroy Austin, American journalist and horticulturist (born 1829)
August 7 – Alexander Blok, Russian poet (born 1880)
August 8 – Juhani Aho, Finnish author and journalist (born 1861)
August 19 – Georges Darien, French anarchist writer (born 1862)
August 25 – Nikolay Gumilev, Russian poet (executed, born 1886)
September 3 - Maria I. Johnston, American author, journalist, editor and lecturer (born 1835)
September 22 - Ivan Vazov, Bulgarian poet, novelist and playwright (born 1850)
October 1 – Lillian Rozell Messenger, American poet (born 1843)
October 10 – Otto von Gierke, German historian (born 1841)
November 1 – Sarah Dyer Hobart, American author of poetry, prose, and songs (born 1845/46)
November 8 – Pavol Országh Hviezdoslav, Slovak poet, dramatist and translator (born 1849)
November 14 – Christabel Rose Coleridge, English novelist and editor (born 1843)
December 28 – Hester A. Benedict, American poet (born 1838)
date unknown
Emma Churchman Hewitt, American author and journalist (born 1850)
Della Campbell MacLeod, American author and journalist (born ca. 1884)

Awards
James Tait Black Memorial Prize for fiction: Walter de la Mare, Memoirs of a Midget
James Tait Black Memorial Prize for biography: Lytton Strachey, Queen Victoria
Nobel Prize in Literature: Anatole France
Pulitzer Prize for Drama: Zona Gale, Miss Lulu Bett
Pulitzer Prize for Poetry: no award given
Pulitzer Prize for the Novel: Edith Wharton, The Age of Innocence

References

 
Years of the 20th century in literature